Talus may refer to:

Fictional entities
 Talos or Talus, a bronze giant in Greek mythology
 Talus, a young champion in Paladins: Champions of the Realm
 Talus, a fictional planet in Star Wars
 Talus, a character in The Faerie Queene by Edmund Spenser
 Talus, an enemy in The Legend of Zelda: Breath of the Wild made of animated stone

Other uses
 Talus (fortification), a sloped portion of a fortified wall
 Talus slope or deposit, a slope formed by an accumulation of broken rock debris, as at the base of a cliff or other high place, also called scree
 Talus, an electronic design automation tool by Magma Design Automation
 Talus bone, an ankle bone

See also
Tallis (disambiguation)
 Tallus, a communications device in the Marvel Universe
 Talos (disambiguation)